The Pengjia Lighthouse is a lighthouse in Pengjia Islet, Zhongzheng District, Keelung, Taiwan.

History
The first phase construction of the lighthouse started in 1906 and completed in 1908. It started its service on 20 September 1909. In December 2015, the lighthouse was designated as a historic site by the Keelung City Government.

Architecture
The lighthouse was designed with brick and tubular structure and equipped with incandescent oil lamp standing at 26.2 meters high. The lighthouse is currently staffed by five workers.

See also

 List of lighthouses in Taiwan

References

External links

 Maritime and Port Bureau MOTC

1909 establishments in Taiwan
Buildings and structures in Keelung
Lighthouses completed in 1909
Lighthouses in Taiwan
Transportation in Keelung